Oszkar Tordai Schilling was a Hungarian artist who mostly used etchings and coal drawings. He was born in Kolozsvar, Austria-Hungary (nowadays Cluj-Napoca in Romania) in 1880. 

His most productive period was in the 1920s. His well-known pieces are "Entombment" (acquired and exhibited by the British Museum), "Samaritaine" and "Lámpafénynél".
Some of his pieces are sought and collected at private and public institutions such as Yale University.

References 

 The British Museum.

1880 births
Year of death missing
Artists from Cluj-Napoca
Hungarian artists

{[stub}}